Lu is a young adult novel by Jason Reynolds, published October 23, 2018, by Atheneum. It is the fourth book in Reynold's Track series, preceded by Ghost (2016), Patina (2017), and Sunny (2018).

Reception 
Lu received starred reviews from Booklist, as well as positive reviews from School Library Journal and Kirkus.

Booklist's Becca Worthington noted, "Virtually every subplot is a moving moral lesson on integrity, humility, or reconciliation." Kirkus echoed the sentiment, saying,  "emphasizes the triumph of healing and unity" and "showcas[es] children’s power to effect true communal change."

Lu is a Junior Library Guild book.

References 

Atheneum Books books
2018 children's books
Books by Jason Reynolds